Barry Dean (born  1967) is an American country and pop music songwriter based out of Nashville, Tennessee. He has written multiple No. 1 singles including “Pontoon” (Little Big Town), “Day Drinking” (Little Big Town), "Somebody's Daughter" (Tenille Townes), and "Think a Little Less" (Michael Ray), along with a Top 40 hit with “Girls Chase Boys” (Ingrid Michaelson). He has been nominated for a Grammy for Best Country Song on Tim McGraw's "Diamond Rings and Old Barstools."

Early life 
Dean was born in Okmulgee, Oklahoma and grew up in rural Pittsburg, Kansas. He wrote songs and played in bands throughout high school and during his time at Pittsburg State University. Dean briefly pursued songwriting in Los Angeles but abandoned that in his 20s.

Dean returned to Pittsburg and worked as Creative Director for Pitsco Incorporated. He was involved in the education business for several years with a focus on marketing and media technology. In his mid-30s, Dean’s wife encouraged him to pursue songwriting again and signed him up for a cruise held by the Nashville Songwriter’s Association International for aspiring songwriters. The NSAI subsequently invited Dean to a song camp in Nashville. He considers this camp a formative experience where he learned how to write professionally and began to co-write with other Nashville writers.

Songwriting career 
For his first years as a songwriter Dean continued to live in Kansas and would commute into Nashville to co-write. He eventually moved to Nashville and signed with BMG in his mid-30s. His first songwriting cut was Reba McEntire playing “Moving Oleta,” a personal song Dean wrote based on his grandfather’s love for his spouse as she went through Alzheimer’s Disease. His first single, Matrina McBride’s “God’s Will,” was also personal, written in response to his daughter’s premature birth and slow recovery. Rolling Stone included “God’s Will” on its list of the “Saddest Country Songs of All Time.”

Dean has had two No. 1 hits with Little Big Town, his first with “Pontoon” and again with “Day Drinking.” “Pontoon” has been certified double platinum by the Recording Industry Association of America. Dean also reached No. 1 with “Think a Little Less” recorded by Michael Ray. Dean has co-written many hit radio singles including Jason Aldean’s “1994,” Brothers Osborne’s “Rum,” Hunter Hayes’ “Tattoo,” Toby Keith’s “Drinks After Work," Ashley Monroe's "On to Something Good," and Alison Krauss & Union Station's "My Love Follows You Where You Go." In addition to country, Dean's “Girls Chase Boys,” co-written and performed by  Ingrid Michaelson, appeared on multiple radio charts, won a BMI Pop Award, and has been certified platinum by the RIAA.

In the past decade, Dean has had songs recorded by Jason Aldean, Charlotte Church, Billy Currington, Brett Eldredge, Hunter Hayes, Toby Keith, Alison Krauss, Reba McEntire, Jake Owen, Thomas Rhett, LeAnn Rimes, Carrie Underwood, Jon Pardi, Brothers Osbourne, Lori McKenna, and Maren Morris, among others.

“Pontoon,” co-written with Luke Laird and Natalie Hemby, went on to be nominated for a number of Country Music Awards. Tim McGraw’s “Diamond Rings and Barstools,” which Dean co-wrote with Luke Laird and Jonathan Singleton, was nominated for a Grammy for Best Country Song. His music has appeared in movies, such as Act of Valour, and TV shows, such as Nashville and NCIS.

Dean is primarily a co-writer, often working with songwriters Luke Laird, Lori McKenna, and Natalie Hemby. Dean left Universal Music to join Creative Nation with Beth and Luke Laird.

In appreciation for providing him a place to stay after his first child’s premature birth, Dean has been an outspoken advocate and organized a benefit for the Ronald McDonald House of the Four States.

Songwriting discography

Production discography

Awards and nominations
2012

 Country Music Association Single of the Year Winner for Little Big Town's "Pontoon"

2013

MusicRow’s Breakthrough Songwriter of the Year Nominee
CMA Song of the Year Nominee for Little Big Town’s “Pontoon”
ACA Song of the Year Nominee for Little Big Town’s “Pontoon”
NSAI Songs I Wish I'd Written Award for Little Big Town’s “Pontoon”

2015
NSAI Songs I Wish I'd Written Award for Tim McGraw's "Diamond Rings And Old Barstools"
BMI Pop Award for Ingrid Michaelson's "Girls Chase Boys"

2016
58th Annual Grammy Awards Best Country Song Nominee for Tim McGraw's "Diamond Rings And Old Barstools"

References

Living people
1967 births
American country songwriters
American male songwriters
Musicians from Nashville, Tennessee
Record producers from Tennessee
Record producers from Oklahoma
Record producers from Kansas
Songwriters from Tennessee
Songwriters from Oklahoma
Songwriters from Kansas
Canadian Country Music Association Songwriter(s) of the Year winners